Iwi are the largest social units in New Zealand Māori society.  In Māori  roughly means "people" or "nation", and is often translated as "tribe", or "a confederation of tribes". The word is both singular and plural in the Māori language, and is typically pluralised as such in English.

 groups trace their ancestry to the original Polynesian migrants who, according to tradition, arrived from Hawaiki. These super-groupings generally serve symbolic rather than practical functions. Māori use the word rohe to describe the territory or boundaries of iwi.

In modern-day New Zealand,  can exercise significant political power in the management of land and of other assets. For example, the 1997 Treaty of Waitangi settlement between the New Zealand Government and Ngāi Tahu, compensated that  for various losses of the rights guaranteed under the Treaty of Waitangi of 1840.  the tribe has collective assets under management of $1.85 billion.  affairs can have a real impact on New Zealand politics and society.

Naming 
In Māori and in many other Polynesian languages,  literally means "bone" derived from Proto-Oceanic *suRi₁ meaning "thorn, splinter, fish bone". Māori may refer to returning home after travelling or living elsewhere as "going back to the bones" — literally to the burial-areas of the ancestors. Māori author Keri Hulme's novel The Bone People (1985) has a title linked directly to the dual meaning of bone and "tribal people".

Structure 
Each  has a generally recognised territory, but many of these overlap, sometimes completely. This has added a layer of complication to the long-running discussions and court cases about how to resolve historical Treaty claims. The length of coastline emerged as one factor in the final (2004) legislation to allocate fishing-rights in settlement of claims relating to commercial fisheries.

Self-determination 
Some Tūhoe envisage self-determination in specifically -oriented terms.

Iwi identity
Increasing urbanisation of Māori has led to a situation where a significant percentage do not identify with any particular . The following extract from a 2000 High Court of New Zealand judgment discussing the process of settling fishing rights illustrates some of the issues:

... 81 per cent of Maori now live in urban areas, at least one-third live outside their tribal influence, more than one-quarter do not know their iwi or for some reason do not choose to affiliate with it, at least 70 per cent live outside the traditional tribal territory and these will have difficulties, which in many cases will be severe, in both relating to their tribal heritage and in accessing benefits from the settlement. It is also said that many Maori reject tribal affiliation because of a working-class unemployed attitude, defiance and frustration. Related but less important factors, are that a hapu may belong to more than one iwi, a particular hapu may have belonged to different iwi at different times, the tension caused by the social and economic power moving from the iwi down rather than from the hapu up, and the fact that many iwi do not recognise spouses and adoptees who do not have kinship links.

In the 2006 census, 16 per cent of the 643,977 people who claimed Māori ancestry did not know their . Another 11 per cent did not state their , or stated only a general geographic region, or merely gave a  name. Initiatives like the Iwi Helpline are trying to make it easier for people to identify their , and the proportion who "don't know" dropped relative to previous censuses.

Pan-tribalism
Some established pan-tribal organisations may exert influence across  divisions. The Rātana Church, for example, operates across  divisions, and the Māori King Movement, though principally congregated around Waikato/Tainui, aims to transcend some  functions in a wider grouping.

Iwi radio

Many  operate or are affiliated with media organisations. Under their funding agreement, the stations must produce programmes in the local Māori language and actively promote local Māori culture.

A two-year Massey University survey of 30,000 people published in 2003 indicated 50 per cent of Māori in National Māori Radio Network broadcast areas listened to an  station.

The Victoria University of Wellington Te Reo Māori Society campaigned for Māori radio, helping to set up Te Reo o Poneke, the first Māori-owned radio operation, using airtime on Wellington student-radio station Radio Active in 1983. Twenty-one  radio stations were set up between 1989 and 1994, receiving Government funding in accordance with a Treaty of Waitangi claim. This group of radio stations formed various networks, becoming .

Major iwi

Largest iwi by population 
 Ngāpuhi – 165,301 (in 2018) – based in the Northland Region
 Ngāti Porou – 92,349 (in 2018) – based in Gisborne Region and East Cape
 Waikato Tainui - 84,030 (in 2018) – based in the Waikato Region 
 Ngāti Kahungungu - 82,239 (in 2018) based on the East Coast of the North Island.
 Ngāi Tahu/ Kāi Tahu - 74,082(in 2018) based in the South Island.
 Te Arawa – 60,719 (in 2018) – based in the Bay of Plenty Region
 Ngāti Tūwharetoa – 47,930 (in 2018) – based in the central North Island.
 Ngāi Tūhoe – 46,479 (in 2018) – based in Te Urewera and Whakatane
 Ngāti Maniapoto – 45,719 (in 2018) – based in Waikato and Waitomo

Largest iwi groupings by population
 No affiliation – 110,928 (in 2013) – includes New-Zealand-based Māori with no  affiliation
 Waikato Tainui – 55,995 (in 2013) – based in the Waikato Region
 Ngāi Tahu Whanui – 55,986 (in 2013) – based in the South Island

Other notable iwi
 Ngāti Tama (based in Taranaki, Chatham Islands, Wellington and Te Tau Ihu)
 Ngāti Toa (based in Porirua, having migrated from Waikato in the 1820s under the leadership of Te Rauparaha)
 Ngāti Ruanui (based in the Taranaki region)
 Ngāti Whātua (based in and north of Auckland – notably Bastion Point in Ōrākei)
 Te Ātiawa – Taranaki and Lower Hutt
 Whakatōhea (based in the Ōpōtiki district)
 Ngāti Hikairo -rangatiratanga in Kāwhia, Ōpārau and Waipā in the King Country)

Notes

References

External links 
 Te Kāhui Māngai – Directory of Iwi and Māori Organisations
 Urban Māori article in The New Zealand Herald (details on the creation and rationale for the National Urban Māori Authority)
 Tribal organisation in Te Ara – the Encyclopedia of New Zealand

 
Māori words and phrases
Māori society